Silsby Spalding (May 29, 1886 – May 5, 1949) was an American businessman and politician. He served as the first Mayor of Beverly Hills, California from 1926 to 1928.

Early life
Silsby Morse Spalding was born on May 29, 1886 in Minneapolis, Minnesota. His father was Salathiel Martin Spalding and his mother, Sarah Eglantine Camp. He studied at the Pomona College Preparatory School in Claremont, California, and later at Stanford University.

Career
Spalding was a sporting goods magnate. He also served as one of the earliest Presidents of the Aero Club of Southern California, and was an executive at the Mexican Eagle Petroleum Company and the Pan-American Petroleum and Transport Co.

Spalding served as the first Mayor of Beverly Hills, California from 1926 to 1928. During his tenure, he appointed Will Rogers as honorary mayor, garnering worldwide publicity for Beverly Hills.

Personal life
Spalding married Caroline Canfield (1890-1970), daughter of oilman Charles A. Canfield (1848-1913) in 1911. They had a daughter, Deborah C. Spalding (1921-2011).

In 1912, after Canfield's death, they moved into Grayhall, an estate located at 1100 Carolyn Way, formerly built by Carole Lombard's father as a hunting lodge and later owned by George Hamilton and Bernard Cornfeld. From 1918 to 1921, they lived in the Frank Flint Estate, a Colonial Revival-style mansion resembling a Southern plantation located at 1006 North Crescent Drive. He later purchased the Tecolote Ranch in Goleta, California, where he raised purebred cattle and horses, and grew walnut and citrus trees.

Death and legacy
Spalding died on May 5, 1949 at his main residence at 1019 Laurel Way in Beverly Hills, California.

Spalding Drive in Beverly Hills is named in his honor.

References

1886 births
1949 deaths
Politicians from Minneapolis
Pomona College alumni
Politicians from Los Angeles
Mayors of Beverly Hills, California
Businesspeople from Los Angeles
20th-century American politicians
Businesspeople from Minneapolis
20th-century American businesspeople